The Agricultural Land Reserve (ALR) is a collection of agricultural land in British Columbia in which agriculture is recognized as the priority. Some ALR blocks cover thousands of hectares while others are small pockets of only a few hectares. The reserve is administered by the Agricultural Land Commission (ALC), consisting of a chair and six vice-chairs appointed by the Lieutenant Governor-in-Council of British Columbia (cabinet) and twelve regular commissioners appointed by the provincial Minister of Agriculture.

The ALR was established by the British Columbia New Democratic Party government of Dave Barrett in 1973, when it was considered to be the most progressive legislation of its kind in North America. It was intended to permanently protect valuable agricultural land that has among the most fertile soil in the country from being lost. Despite having been in existence for over 40 years, however, the ALR continues to be threatened by urbanization and the land development industry.

The Commission divides the province into several panel regions: South Coast, Interior, Island, Kootenay, North, and Okanagan.

The ALC also categorizes soil into seven numbered land capability classes, with Class 1 being the most arable land and Class 7 being the least. There are also several lettered sub-classes, representing a number of issues with farming on a parcel of land.

A tax break is applicable to property in the ALR.

History 
In the 1960s and 70s, almost 6000 hectares of prime agricultural land was being lost per year in British Columbia. It was recognized that the province had a lack of arable farmland, and food security was dwindling. The provincial government introduced the Land Commission Act on April 18, 1973, creating the Agricultural Land Commission. The Commission identified 4.7 million hectares to be included in the Agricultural Land Reserve, assisted by local governments and public hearings.

In 1977, the ALC's secondary responsibilities of creating green space and assembling land for urban uses were dropped, due to overlap with other departments.

Between 1980 and 1984, the Commission conducted a thorough review of ALR zoning boundaries, using new maps and soil information. Eastern Vancouver Island was given special attention.

On May 29, 2014, the BC Liberal government of Christy Clark split the ALR into two different zones with different restrictions: Zone 1 (Island, Okanagan, South Coast) and Zone 2 (North, Kootenay, Interior). ALR-protected land in Zone 2 had to also consider economical, cultural, and regional planning objectives, while Zone 1 prioritized agricultural purposes above all else.

On November 20, 2018, the NDP under John Horgan reverted the two-zone split, restricted the number of residences allowed on agricultural land to one, and added an upper limit of 500 m2 to the floor area of any residences on the ALR.

Controversy 

Since its inception, critics of ALR policy claimed that ALR restrictions prevented profit-taking by landowners, especially in British Columbia's rapidly-growing Lower Mainland region, where in the early 21st century, land prices are among the highest in North America. The claim is also made that owners of land in the ALR are not sufficiently compensated for their property and that it constitutes unreasonable interference in private property rights. Critics also claim that the Agricultural Land Reserve has both inflated property values and created a severe housing shortage throughout British Columbia and that much of the poverty caused in British Columbia is a result of regressive land use policies.

Many ALR property owners, especially those closer to urban areas, where commercial real estate prices are higher, maintain vacant lots in anticipation of zoning changes, as the ALR does not stipulate that the land must produce, agriculturally-speaking. However, media reports still indicate that the ALR has widespread popularity among British Columbia voters.

There has been criticism of inconsistency in how policies are applied, in one instance, a farmer was forced to produce alcohol for a restaurant to stay open.

Defenders of the ALR respond that the province has little arable land, especially of such productivity as exists on the Fraser River delta around Vancouver, and that the ALR protects British Columbia's important agriculture sector. They also suggest that a large part of the Lower Mainland's development pressure comes from the lack of a unified land use and transportation plan for the Metro Vancouver Regional District and the failure of municipalities to replace sprawl with densification.

Finally, they claim that the ALR is a reasonable extension of the government's right to zone land for various uses. They have been distressed in recent years at what they see as the weakening of the policy by the designation of golf courses as "agricultural land" and the removal of ALR-protected lands for residential, commercial, and industrial development.

See also
 Greenbelt (Golden Horseshoe), a similar reserve in Ontario.

References

External links
 Agricultural Land Commission.
 The Agricultural Land Commission Act, the enabling legislation of the ALC and the ALR 	 
 Agriculture - Province of B.C.
 The British Columbia Ministry of Agriculture

Geography of British Columbia
Agriculture in British Columbia
British Columbia government departments and agencies
Land management
Zoning